The Guelph Royals name has been used for several hockey teams based in Guelph, Ontario. The most prominent was a junior ice hockey team in the Ontario Hockey Association from 1960 to 1963, that played home games at the Guelph Memorial Gardens. The junior Royals were affiliated with the NHL's New York Rangers. 

Other Guelph Royals teams played from 1908, and briefly in 1909 (6 games) in the Ontario Professional Hockey League, and also circa 1920s as Ontario Hockey Association senior teams. The Royals namesake is the City of Guelph's nickname as the "Royal City."

History
The junior Guelph Royals arose when the Guelph Biltmore Mad Hatters were sold in 1960, and the new ownership renamed the team. Emile Francis was head coach of the Royals for the 1960–61 OHA season and the 1961–62 OHA season.

Guelph won the Hamilton Spectator Trophy during the 1960–61 OHA season, finishing 1st overall. The Royals' Rod Gilbert led the OHA in goals scored with 54, points scored with 103, and Jean Ratelle led the league in assists with 61. Gilbert won Eddie Powers Memorial Trophy with the most goals in the league, and was also awarded the Red Tilson Trophy as the most outstanding player. In the playoffs, the Royals lost in the league finals to the Toronto St. Michael's Majors, 4 games to 2 with a tie.

Many players graduated from junior hockey after the 1960–61 OHA season, and the Royals did not recover their previous form. After two declining seasons the franchise was in financial trouble again. At the end of the 1962–63 OHA season, the team moved to nearby Kitchener, Ontario, becoming the Kitchener Rangers, taking the name of the NHL parent club.

Some of the Guelph Royals players who graduated from the junior ranks played on the newly formed Senior OHA Guelph Regals team.

NHL alumni
Twenty-one former Guelph Royals have played in the National Hockey League, and two have elected to the Hockey Hall of Fame; Rod Gilbert and Jean Ratelle.

Season-by-season results
Regular season results

Playoff results
1960-61 Defeated Niagara Falls Flyers 10 points to 4 in quarter-finals. Received second-round bye. Lost to Toronto St. Michael's Majors 9 points to 5 in finals.
1961-62 Out of playoffs.
1962-63 Out of playoffs.

References

Defunct Ontario Hockey League teams
Sport in Guelph
1960 establishments in Ontario
1963 disestablishments in Ontario
Ice hockey clubs established in 1960